Body preservation may refer to:

 Conservation and restoration of human remains, the long-term preservation and care of human remains in museum collections
 Cryonics, the storage of human remains using cryopreservation
 Embalming, the preservation of human remains by treatment with chemicals
 Mummification, the preservation of humans or animals by removing all moisture from the body
 Plastination, a technique used in anatomy to preserve bodies or body parts, developed in 1977